18th was a station on the Chicago Transit Authority's South Side main line, which is now part of the Green Line. The station was located at 18th Street and Wabash Avenue in the Near South Side neighborhood of Chicago. 18th was situated south of Roosevelt/Wabash and north of Cermak. 18th opened on June 6, 1892, and closed on August 1, 1949.

History
The South Side Elevated Railroad, the first rapid transit company in Chicago, opened on June 6, 1892, with ten stations, one of which was located on 18th Street. Eight of the ten stations on the line were built with street-level station houses.

In 1907, the railroad was allowed by the city to construct a third track for express operations. In exchange, it promised to demolish the station houses north of 43rd Street, including all of the original street-level station houses, and replace them with mezzanines in order to clear the alleyway below the track.

Notes

References

Defunct Chicago "L" stations
Railway stations in the United States opened in 1892
Railway stations closed in 1949
1892 establishments in Illinois
1949 disestablishments in Illinois
Railway stations in Chicago